"Endless Love" is a pop song performed by the German singer Jeanette. The song was written by Jeanette and Jörg Weisselberg and produced by Weisselberg and Steffen Langenfeld for Jeanette's sixth album, Naked Truth (2006). It was released as a single on 14 October 2005 in Germany.

Formats and track listings
These are the formats and track listings of major single releases of "Endless Love".

CD single
(602498745700; Released )
"Endless Love" (New version) – 3:26
"Endless Love" (Chillout mix) – 3:26

Maxi CD single
(602498771624; Released )
"Endless Love" (New version) – 3:26
"Endless Love" (L.A. mix) – 3:34
"Endless Love" (Chillout mixx) – 3:26
"Endless Love" (Instrumental mix) – 3:30
"Endless Love" music video

Digital download #1
(Released )
"Endless Love" (New version) – 3:26
"Endless Love" (L.A. mix) – 3:34
"Endless Love" (Chillout mixx) – 3:26
"Endless Love" (Instrumental mix) – 3:30
"Endless Love" (Ray Stants remix) – 3:24

Digital download #2
(Released )
"Endless Love" (New version) – 3:26
"Endless Love" (L.A. mix) – 3:34
"Endless Love" (Chillout mixx) – 3:26
"Endless Love" (Instrumental mix) – 3:30
"Endless Love" (Ray Stants orchestral remix) – 3:48

Charts

References

External links
Official website

2006 singles
2005 songs
Jeanette Biedermann songs
Songs written by Jeanette Biedermann
Songs written by Jörg Weisselberg
2000s ballads